The Neptune-class ships of the line were a class of three 98-gun second rates, designed for the Royal Navy by Sir John Henslow. All three of the ships in the class took part in the Battle of Trafalgar in 1805.

Ships

Builder: Deptford Dockyard
Ordered: 15 February 1790
Launched: 28 January 1797
Fate: Broken up, 1818

Builder: Chatham Dockyard
Ordered: 9 December 1790
Launched: 11 September 1798
Fate: Sold out of the service, 1838

Builder: Portsmouth Dockyard
Ordered: 17 January 1788
Launched: 13 June 1801
Fate: Broken up, 1857

References

Lavery, Brian (2003) The Ship of the Line - Volume 1: The development of the battlefleet 1650-1850. Conway Maritime Press. .

 
Ship of the line classes